Catocala kusnezovi is a moth in the family Erebidae first described by Rudolf Püngeler in 1914. It is found in Kazakhstan and Xinjiang, China.

References

kusnezovi
Moths described in 1914
Moths of Asia